Vero Lake Estates is an unincorporated community in Indian River County, Florida, United States, off CR 510. It contains the western portion of Wabasso Road, although it is not connected to CR 510. The entire area contains a street grid, (77th Street on the south; County Road 512 (95th Street) on the north, and 90th Avenue on the east; 108th Avenue on the west).

Vero Lake Estates is part of Vero Beach Metropolitan Statistical Area.

Geography
Vero Lake Estates is located at  (27.745, -80.5281).

Main roads

Wabasso Road
This road is the westernmost portion of 85th Street, although it is not connected to CR 510. It is a dirt road, which has now been partially paved, with the major intersection of 101st Avenue, where the pavement ends. The western part of the road is split with a canal. Near CR 510, it becomes 90th Avenue. The western terminus is 106th Avenue, near Interstate 95.

101st Avenue
This road is paved and provides access to County Road 512. It is paved until 79th Street and has a traffic signal at CR512 and 101st Avenue.

87th ST
This connects CR510 to the inner VLE, it is paved and has a traffic light at the intersection of 87th ST and CR 510.

91st Ave
This road runs parallel to 510's north–south direction. The road is paved between 87th Ave and 79th, and serves as VLE's easternmost main road.

Facts
The subdivision of Vero Lake Estates was foreclosed upon after it was developed mainly because of the distance between where most of Sebastian commerce and business was located. It became a popular area to live after the housing boom and the population explosion in Indian River County circa the early 2000s. Developers bought blocks of land because of the extremely low prices and the abundance of land.

There are now some 2700 homes in the area.

References

Unincorporated communities in Indian River County, Florida
Unincorporated communities in Florida